Jomo Cosmos are a South African  association football club based in Johannesburg that plays in the ABC Motsepe league. The club is owned and coached by South African football legend Jomo Sono.

In the 2021–22 National First Division season the club was relegated to the Third Division stream of professional football in South Africa.

History
The club was founded on 29 January 1983, upon the remnants of the previously well-known and successful club Highlands Park, which Sono opted to buy when he ended his playing career in the United States. The club was named Dion Cosmos in its initial 1983 season, with the first part of the name representing the previous sponsor of Highlands Park and the second part being the fingerprint of Jomo Sono, who decided to name his newly bought club after his former NASL club, the New York Cosmos. Since 1984, the name of the club has been Jomo Cosmos.

Sono's policy for development has always been to recognise and build upon raw talent. Sono's team accentuated and developed a strong youth policy and through the years has gained a reputation for discovering and developing some of the finest talent to have played in the league, for the South Africa national team and abroad. Under Sono's ownership, the club went on to achieve several successes: winning the South African Premier Division title in 1987, the Bob Save Super Bowl in 1990, the Coca-Cola Cup in 2002 and 2005, and the SAA Supa 8 in 2003.

In 2008, Jomo Cosmos were relegated from top-flight football for the first time since 1993. After one season in the National First Division, they returned to the PSL for the 2009–10 season, having won the Inland Stream and the promotion play-off against Carara Kicks. They were immediately relegated again, leading several to question Sono's future as the club's manager. Sono stayed, and led the club to the 2010–11 National First Division title and promotion. They were yet again relegated in their first season back, finishing in last place. They would stay in the second tier for three seasons, before winning promotion through the 2014-15 PSL play-off tournament. Cosmos were relegated again in their first season back, after losing 3–1 to Maritzburg United on the final day, ending the season in last place.

Honours
Telkom Knockout: 3
2002, 2003, 2005

Nedbank Cup: 1
1990

NSL: 1
1987

Second Division: 1
1994

Club records
Most starts:  Andrew Rabutla 229
Most goals:  Manuel Bucuane 88
Most capped player:  Manuel Bucuane
Most starts in a season: Webster Lichaba (1986),  Helman Mkhalele (1993) both 46
Most goals in a season:  Philemon Masinga 27 (1991)
Record victory: 6–0 vs Grand All Stars (31 August 1985), (Mainstay Cup); vs Mabopane United Brothers (30 August 1986), (Mainstay Cup);  vs Umtata Bush Bucks (28 March 1992), (NSL); vs Denver Sundowns (21 February 1993), (African Cup Winners Cup)
Record defeat: 0–5 vs Kaizer Chiefs (24 December 2001), (Coca-Cola Cup)

Historical League results

1983 (NPSL) – 9th
1984 (NPSL) – 9th
1985 (NSL) – 4th
1986 (NSL) – 12th
1987 (NSL) – 1st
1988 (NSL) – 2nd
1989 (NSL) – 4th
1990 (NSL) – 5th
1991 (NSL) – 7th
1992 (NSL) – 5th
1993 (NSL) – 18th *Rel
1994 (OKL) – 2nd *Pro
1995 (NSL) – 10th
1996 (League phase) – 7th

1996–97 (PSL) – 7th
1997–98 (PSL) – 7th
1998–99 (PSL) – 10th
1999–00 (PSL) – 7th
2000–01 (PSL) – 4th
2001–02 (PSL) – 4th
2002–03 (PSL) – 8th
2003–04 (PSL) – 13th
2004–05 (PSL) – 13th
2005–06 (PSL) – 9th
2006–07 (PSL) – 7th
2007–08 (PSL) – 16th *Rel
2008–09 (NFD) – 1st *Pro
2009–10 (PSL) – 16th *Rel

2010–11 (NFD) – 1st *Pro
2011–12 (PSL) – 16th *Rel
2012–13 (NFD) – 14th
2013–14 (NFD) – 6th
2014–15 (NFD) – 2nd *Pro
2015–16 (PSL) – 16th *Rel
2016–17 (NFD) – 10th 
2017-18 (NFD) – 3rd 
2018-19 (NFD) – 13th 
2019-20 (NFD) - 13th

Club officials/Technical team
Owner/Chairman:  Jomo Sono
Football manager:  Bamuza Sono
Coach:  Jomo Sono
Assistant coaches:  Siza Dlamini &  Gerald Mtshali
Goalkeeping coaches:  Mpangi Merikani &  Avril Phali

First team squad
2019-20 season

Shirt sponsor and kit manufacturer
Shirt sponsor: N/A
Kit manufacturer: N/A

References

External links
 
 Premier Soccer League

 
Association football clubs established in 1983
Premier Soccer League clubs
Soccer clubs in Johannesburg
National First Division clubs
1983 establishments in South Africa